ASFB may refer to:
 Australian Society for Fish Biology, a scientific organisation based in Australia
 ASF Bobo Dioulasso, a football club in Burkina Faso
 Aspen Santa Fe Ballet, an American contemporary dance company
 All Saved Freak Band, an American Christian rock band